Cryptic Collection 2 is a compilation album by Twiztid. Released on October 22, 2001, it is the second in the Cryptic Collection series, followed by Cryptic Collection Vol. 3, each containing rare tracks not available on regular releases.

Track listing 

Notes
Tracks 1, 4, and 11 were outtakes from Twiztid's second album Freek Show (2000)
Tracks 2, 5, 8, and 12 appeared on the first version of Twiztid's debut album Mostasteless (1997)
Tracks 3 and 6 appeared on Jamie Madrox's 1995 solo album as Mr. Bones, Sacrifice (1995)
Track 7 appeared on a single for The Pendulum comic book series (2000)
Track 9 appeared on House of Krazees' second album Home Bound (1994)
Track 10 were part of Jamie Madrox's scrapped solo album as Mr. Bones, called Something Weird (1995)
Track 13 was a Twiztid, Blaze Ya Dead Homie, and Anybody Killa collaboration which was released as a single at Hallowicked (2000)
Track 14 was a Dark Lotus track made specifically for the compilation (2001)

References

B-side compilation albums
Twiztid compilation albums
2001 compilation albums
Psychopathic Records compilation albums
Sequel albums